32 Minutes and 17 Seconds with Cliff Richard is the fifth studio album by Cliff Richard (seventh album overall) and was released in September 1962. The album reached #3 on the UK Albums Chart. The album contains 14 songs, six with the Shadows and eight with the Norrie Paramor Orchestra.

One single from the album, "It'll Be Me" was released in August 1962 in the lead up to the album's release and reached #2 in the UK Singles Chart.

In Canada, the album was released with the title "On Your Marks...Get Set...Lets Go!" It was released in June 1963 and spent six weeks at number 1 on Chum's Album Index during July and August and thirteen weeks in the top 5.

Track listing

Personnel
Cliff Richard and the Shadows
Cliff Richard – vocals
Hank Marvin – lead guitar
Bruce Welch – rhythm guitar
Jet Harris – bass guitar
Brian 'Licorice' Locking – bass guitar
Brian Bennett – drums

Chart performance

References

Cliff Richard albums
1962 albums
EMI Columbia Records albums
Albums produced by Norrie Paramor